Westkreuz station may refer to the following S-Bahn railway stations in Germany:
Berlin Westkreuz station in Berlin
Munich-Westkreuz station in Munich

S-Bahn stations in Germany